The Illinois Intercollege Conference was a short-lived intercollegiate athletic football conference that existed between 1938 and 1942. The league had members, as its name suggests, in the state of Illinois.

Champions

1938 – Bradley and Lake Forest
1939 – Illinois Wesleyan
1940 – Illinois Wesleyan, Lake Forest, and Millikin
1941 – Millikin
1942 – Millikin

See also
List of defunct college football conferences

References

Defunct college sports conferences in the United States
College sports in Illinois